The Pastoral Letter of the Polish Bishops to their German Brothers was a pastoral letter sent on 18 November 1965 by Polish bishops of the Roman Catholic Church to their German counterparts. It was foremost an invitation to the 1000 Year Anniversary Celebrations of Poland's Christianization in 966. In this invitation letter the bishops asked for cooperation not only with Catholics but with Protestants as well.

While recalling past and recent historical events, the bishops stretched out their hands in forgiveness and are asking for forgiveness. Here referred to as Letter of Reconciliation of the Polish Bishops to the German Bishops it is actually only one part of the extensive groundbreaking invitation and letter, where they declared: "We forgive and ask for forgiveness" (for the crimes of World War II).

Significance

It was one of the first attempts at reconciliation after the tragedies of the Second World War, in which Germany invaded Poland; both countries lost millions of people, while millions more, both Poles and Germans, had to flee from their homes or were forcibly resettled. Pope Pius XII had nominated German bishops over Polish dioceses, which was seen as the Holy See's recognition of the German conquest, and generated popular feeling against the Vatican. A much larger part was the invitation and the attempt of the Catholic bishops to gain distance from the Communists who were ruling Poland.

Among prominent supporters of this letter was Krakow's Archbishop, Karol Wojtyła, who later became Pope John Paul II in 1978.

The letter was answered by bishops of both of the then-two Germanies together, but the contents of the reply have been assesssed by Polish historians as disappointing.

Reaction

Widely publicised in Poland's churches, the letter drew a strong reaction from the Communist authorities of the People's Republic of Poland. Władysław Gomułka saw it as clearly aimed at countering his propaganda, which saw West Germany as the main external enemy of Poland and continued hostility between Poland and West Germany as one of the main guarantees of social order in the Recovered Territories.

To counteract the threat of losing control over people's minds, the Communist authorities reacted with anti-German and anti-Catholic hysteria. The Primate of Poland, Stefan Wyszyński, was denied a passport for his trip to Rome and on January 15, 1966, Gomułka announced preparations for state celebrations of the 1000 Years of the Polish State, intended as a countermeasure against the church-sponsored celebrations of 1000 years of the baptism of Poland. Most German linguists were forced to sign a letter of protest; those who refused were fired from their universities. In addition, the authorities twice refused permission for a planned visit of Pope Paul VI to Poland in 1966. The following year the Polish United Workers' Party planned to limit the number of religious schools, which was also seen as a penalty for the Letter of Reconciliation. The anti-church campaign lasted until Gomułka's downfall in 1970.

See also 
 Nazi crimes against the Polish nation
 Generalplan Ost
 Expulsion of Germans after World War II
 Flight and expulsion of Germans from Poland during and after World War II
 World War II atrocities in Poland
 Warschauer Kniefall

References

Further reading 
Piotr H. Kosicki (2009). "Caritas across the Iron Curtain? Polish-German Reconciliation and the Bishops' Letter of 1965". East European Politics & Societies 23 (2): 213–243. 
Basil Kerski; Tomasz Kycia; Robert Żurek (2006). "Wir vergeben und bitten um Vergebung". Der Briefwechsel der polnischen und deutschen Bischöfe von 1965 und seine Wirkung. Osnabrück: Fibre-Verlag. 
Basil Kerski; Tomasz Kycia; Robert Żurek (2007). "Przebaczamy i prosimy o przebaczenie". Orędzie Biskupów Polskich i Odpowiedź Niemieckiego Episkopatu z 1965 roku. Olsztyn: Wydawnictwo Borussia. 
Piotr Madajczyk, Na drodze do pojednania. Wokół orędzia biskupów polskich do biskupów niemieckich z 1965 roku, PWN, Warszawa 1994
Piotr Madajczyk, Wir vergeben und bitten um Vergebung...“, „Więź“ Sonderausgabe 1994, s. 35–51,

External links
 
 

1965 in Germany
History of Catholicism in Poland
Letters (message)
Germany–Poland relations
1965 documents
1965 in Poland